S Diary is a 2004 South Korean romantic comedy film about a woman who decides to interrogate her past lovers about why their relationships failed - then hatches a plot to take revenge on them.

On a dreary day, Jin-hee (Kim Sun-a) gets dumped by her boyfriend (Jang Hyuk) with the final note that he was only interested in making love to her but not in a lasting relationship. This triggers her curiosity about whether her past three lovers were also only after her sexual favors. She checks back on her previous boyfriends - Ku-hyeon (Lee Hyun-woo), an advocate of strong religious beliefs, macho college lover Jeong-seok (Kim Su-ro) and inexperienced Yoo-in (Gong Yoo) who makes a living as wandering artist. Will Jin-hee's emotional journey be rewarded with sincere answers from her old admirers?

References

External links
  
 S Diary at SidusHQ 
 
 
 

2004 films
2004 romantic comedy films
2000s Korean-language films
South Korean romantic comedy films
CJ Entertainment films
2000s South Korean films